In the Roman Empire, the dediticii were one of the three classes of libertini. The dediticii existed as a class of persons who were neither slaves, nor Roman citizens (cives), nor Latini (that is, those holding Latin rights), at least as late as the time of Ulpian.

The civil status of dediticii was analogous to the condition of a conquered people who did not individually lose their freedom, but as a community lost all political existence as the result of a deditio, an unconditional surrender. A person who became a subject of the Empire through a deditio (that is, a person who was a dediticius) was excluded from the universal citizenship extended to all freeborn inhabitants of the empire under the Constitutio Antoniniana.

The Lex Aelia Sentia provided that, if a slave was put in bonds by his master as a punishment, or branded, or put to the torture for an offence and convicted, or delivered up to fight with wild beasts, or sent into a gladiatorial school (ludus), or put in confinement (custodia), and then manumitted either by his then owner, or by another owner, he merely acquired the status of a peregrinus dediticius, and had not even the privileges of the ius Latinum. The peregrini dediticii were those who, in former times, had taken up arms against the Roman people, and being conquered, had surrendered themselves. They were, in fact, a people who were absolutely subdued, and yielded unconditionally to the conquerors, and, of course, had no other relation to Rome than that of subjects. The form of deditio occurs in Livy.

Dediticii who were former slaves were perceived as a threat to society, regardless of whether their master's punishments had been justified, and if they came within a hundred miles of Rome, they were subject to reenslavement.

Sources
Long, George. 1875. "Dediticii". A Dictionary of Greek and Roman Antiquities. William Smith, ed. (London: John Murray), p. 388.

References

Roman law
Social classes in ancient Rome
Slavery in ancient Rome